The International Paystar (also known as 5000i and PayStar) is a series of trucks that was manufactured by International Harvester and its successor, Navistar International.  Produced from 1972 to 2016 across three generations, the Paystar replaced the long-running 210/230 and M-series.  

Developed for both on and off-road use, the Paystar was the largest commercially-marketed product range sold by International, intended for vocational applications (primarily construction-related).  For 2017 the Paystar underwent a substantial redesign, becoming the International HX series.

History
The PayStar was introduced by International Harvester in January 1972 as a construction-specific version of the conventional Transtar.

From 1972 through 1980, it was offered in two ranges: the 5050 with mid-range engines and the 5070 with heavy duty engines. Available in 4×4, 6×4, and 6×6 configurations, they were usually straight trucks but most offered trailer brake options. Semi tractors were also available.

1972-1986 models
Table covers the 1972-1974 Paystar range.

The second generation trucks increased weight capacity and engine power. The plate fenders and butterfly hoods were replaced with a one-piece forward tilting hood. The 5500 had a forward front axle, the 5600 had a setback, and the 5900 was a semi tractor.

2004 models

By 2013, the PayStar was commonly a semi tractor although straight truck applications were still offered. Severe service straight truck applications were handled by the Workstar series, which offered no semi-tractors. In 2013 the PayStar is only offered as a 6×4 or 8×6 with high horsepower engines.

2013 models

Gallery

Notes

References

External links
International Harvester PayStar (IMCDB.com)

International Harvester vehicles
Navistar International trucks
Vehicles introduced in 1972